The Low Highway is the 15th studio album by singer-songwriter Steve Earle, released in 2013. The album features two songs co-written by Earle and Lucia Micarelli: "Love's Gonna Blow My Way", "After Mardi Gras". Two songs from the album, "After Mardi Gras" and "That All You Got?", are featured in the HBO TV Series Treme.

The album debuted at No. 12 on Top Country Albums, and No. 39 on Billboard 200, selling 11,000 copies in the first week. It has sold 42,000 copies in the US as of February 2015.

Reception

The album garnered generally positive critical response. Neil Spencer of The Guardian wrote, Earle's "playing is immaculate and the songcraft admirable".

The song, "Invisible", was nominated for Best American Roots Song at the 56th Grammy Awards.

Track listing
All songs written by Steve Earle unless otherwise noted.
 "The Low Highway" – 3:59
 "Calico County" – 2:59
 "Burnin' It Down" – 2:57
 "That All You Got?" – 3:00
 "Love's Gonna Blow My Way" (Earle, Lucia Micarelli) – 2:49
 "After Mardi Gras" (Earle, Lucia Micarelli) – 4:04
 "Pocket Full of Rain" – 3:15
 "Invisible" – 4:19
 "Warren Hellman's Banjo" – 1:47
 "Down the Road Pt. II" – 2:36
 "21st Century Blues" – 3:40
 "Remember Me" – 4:35

Personnel

Musicians
Steve Earle – guitar, mandolin, banjo, piano and vocal
Allison Moorer – piano, organ, accordion, harmonium and vocal
Chris Masterson – guitar, pedal steel guitar
Eleanor Whitmore – fiddle, baritone fiddle, mandolin and the thing
Kelley Looney – upright bass and electric bass
Will Rigby – drums, percussion
Siobhan Kennedy

Production
Produced by Steve Earle and Ray Kennedy
Recorded, mixed and mastered by Ray Kennedy at Ben's Studio and Room and Board - Nashville, Tennessee
Additional mastering for vinyl by George Ingram at NRP - Nashville, Tennessee
Assistant engineer - Leslie Richter

Artwork
Cover artwork by Tony Fitzpatrick
Design by Paul Moore
Photos by Ted Barron

Chart performance

References

2013 albums
Steve Earle albums
New West Records albums